This article describes modern efforts by one country, generally Russia, to induce residents of another, voluntarily or involuntarily, to take up its citizenship.  For the Soviet practice of mandating citizens identity papers (internal passports), see Propiska in the Soviet Union.

Passportization is defined as the mass conferral of citizenship to the population of a particular foreign territory by distributing passports, generally within a relatively short period. This policy has primarily been used by Russian authorities who have provided easy access for persons, usually holders of former Soviet passports, to apply for Russian passports. The basis for these naturalizations is Art. 14 Russian Citizenship Act, amended in 2002, which allows naturalization in a simplified procedure. In particular, the requirement of five years' residence on Russian territory is suspended for former citizens of the Soviet Union, Art. 14 para. 4 Russian Citizenship Act. 
As the number of Russian passport holders in regions of adjoining nations grows, Russia then invokes its national interest in defending its citizens by promoting the independence or annexation of these regions. This process has been most common in Georgia and Ukraine.

Georgia 
In Georgia this occurred in South Ossetia and Abkhazia, where residents continued to be the citizens of Soviet Union and kept Soviet passports even a decade after the break-up of the Soviet Union.  In 2002, a new Citizenship Law of Russia simplified acquisition of citizenship for any citizen of the Soviet Union, regardless current place of residence.  In Abkhazia and South Ossetia, Russian nationalist non-governmental organizations such as the Congress of Russian Communities of Abkhazia carried papers to a nearby Russian city for processing so that residents did not need to travel to obtain Russian citizenship.  By June 25, 2002, approximately 150,000 Abkhazians had gained Russian citizenship in addition to the 50,000 who already possessed it, with the blessing of authorities in Sukhum.  The Georgian Foreign Ministry denounced the passport allocation as an “unprecedented illegal campaign”.  On February 1, 2011, Soviet passports were no longer considered valid for crossing the Russian-Abkhaz border.

In April 2009, the OSCE High Commissioner on National Minorities stated there was "pressure being exercised on the Georgian population in the Gali District through the limitation of their education rights, compulsory "passportization", forced conscription into the Abkhaz military forces and restrictions on their freedom of movement."  An effort to force ethnic Georgians in Abkhazia to take on Abkhaz citizenship was rebuffed in 2009.

Russia's extraterritorial naturalisation practice in South Ossetia and Abkhazia since 2002 constitutes an intervention contrary to international law and violates Georgia's territorial sovereignty.

Ukraine 
Russia has been naturalising people in the Ukrainian regions of Donetsk and Luhansk on a large scale since 2019. This became possible after Art. 29 para. 1.1 Russian Citizenship Act was inserted by law of 27 December 2018. This provision empowers the Russian President to establish categories of foreign citizens and stateless persons eligible to apply for Russian citizenship under the simplified procedure. By Decree No. 183 of 24 April 2019, residents of the Donetsk and Luhansk regions became eligible accordingly.

During the 2022 Russian invasion of Ukraine, forced passportization has also been done against Ukrainians in the occupied parts of the Kherson and Zaporizhzhia oblasts.

References 

Identity documents
Law enforcement in the Soviet Union